John MacArthur or Macarthur may refer to:

J. Roderick MacArthur (1920–1984), American businessman
John MacArthur (American pastor) (born 1939), American evangelical minister, televangelist, and author
John Macarthur (priest), 20th-century provost of the Cathedral of the Isles in Scotland
John Macarthur (wool pioneer) (1767–1834), Australian wool industry pioneer and Rum Rebel
John D. MacArthur (1897–1978), American philanthropist
John Gordon MacArthur, fictional murder victim from Agatha Christie's And Then There Were None
John Knox MacArthur (1891–1918), American World War I flying ace
John R. MacArthur (born 1956), American journalist
John Stewart MacArthur (died 1920), Scottish inventor of the MacArthur-Forrest process for gold cyanidation (1887)

See also 
 John McArthur (disambiguation)